Walther Mayer (11 March 1887 – 10 September 1948) was an Austrian mathematician, born in Graz, Austria-Hungary. With Leopold Vietoris he is the namesake of the Mayer–Vietoris sequence in topology. He served as an assistant to Albert Einstein, and was nicknamed "Einstein's calculator".

Biography
Mayer studied at the Federal Institute of Technology in Zürich and the University of Paris before receiving his doctorate in 1912 from the University of Vienna; his thesis concerned the Fredholm integral equation. He served in the military between 1914 and 1919, during which he found time to complete a habilitation on differential geometry. Because he was Jewish, he had little opportunity for an academic career in Austria, and left the country; however, in 1926, with help from Einstein, he returned to a position at the University of Vienna as Privatdozent (lecturer). He made a name for himself in topology with the Mayer–Vietoris sequence, and with an axiomatic treatment of homology predating the Eilenberg–Steenrod axioms. He also published a book on Riemannian geometry in 1930, the second volume of a textbook on differential geometry that had been started by Adalbert Duschek with a volume on curves and surfaces.

In 1929, on the recommendation of Richard von Mises, he became Albert Einstein's assistant with the explicit understanding that he work with him on distant parallelism, and from 1931 to 1936, he collaborated with Albert Einstein on the theory of relativity. In 1933, after Hitler's assumption of power, he followed Einstein to the United States and became an associate in mathematics at the Institute for Advanced Study in Princeton, New Jersey. He continued working on mathematics at the Institute, and died in Princeton in 1948.

References

External links
Portrait of Walther Mayer (1940), United States Holocaust Memorial Museum

1887 births
1948 deaths
Austrian mathematicians
Austrian Jews
Austro-Hungarian mathematicians
University of Vienna alumni
Topologists
Institute for Advanced Study people